The 2001 Oklahoma Sooners Football team represented the University of Oklahoma in the 2001 NCAA Division I-A football season, the 107th season of Sooner football. The team was led by third-year head coach Bob Stoops. They played their home games at Oklahoma Memorial Stadium in Norman, Oklahoma. They were a charter member of the Big 12 conference.

Conference play began with a win over the Kansas State Wildcats in Norman on September 29, and ended at home in an upset loss to the Oklahoma State Cowboys in the annual Bedlam Series. The Sooners finished the regular season 10–2 (6–2 in Big 12), finishing second in the Big 12 South. They were invited to the 2002 Cotton Bowl Classic, where they defeated the Arkansas Razorbacks, 10–3.

Following the season, Roy Williams was selected 8th overall in the 2002 NFL Draft, along with Rocky Calmus in the 3rd round.

Schedule

Game summaries

North Carolina

Air Force

North Texas

Kansas State

Texas (Red River Shootout)

Kansas

Baylor

Nebraska

Tulsa

Texas A&M

Texas Tech

Oklahoma State (Bedlam Series)

Arkansas (Cotton Bowl)

Roster

Rankings

2002 NFL Draft

The 2002 NFL Draft was held on April 20–21, 2002 at The Theater at Madison Square Garden in New York City The following Oklahoma players were either selected or signed as undrafted free agents following the draft. Roy Williams was the highest Sooner drafted since Cedric Jones went fifth overall in 1996.

References

Oklahoma
Cotton Bowl Classic champion seasons
Oklahoma Sooners football seasons
Oklahoma Sooners football